The Philippine Racing Commission, abbreviated as Philracom, is a government agency under the Office of the President that functions as the supervisory and regulating body of horse racing in the Philippines. The agency was established on March 20, 1974, through Presidential Decree No. 420 signed by then President Ferdinand Marcos.

Under Sec. 1 of PD 420, it is the Commission's mandate to "promote and direct the accelerated development and continued growth of horse racing not only in pursuance of the sports development program but also in order to ensure the full exploitation of the sport as a source of revenue and employment".

Under Sec. 3 of PD 420, the Commission's aims and objectives are: 
a. To promote, ensure, and maintain efficient and unbiased operation of racing, exclusive of the supervision of betting therein;
b. To raise public confidence in the sport and to minimize infractions of the rules of racing; and
c. To improve the breed of Philippine horses and to prevent illegal importation of race-horses.

The supervision and regulation of the betting aspect of horseracing is handled by the Games and Amusement Board.

In April 2016, Philracom was accepted as a member of the International Federation of Horseracing Authorities.

History

Horse racing in the Philippines
The sport as practiced in the country is flat racing on dirt; there are no turf tracks in the Philippines.

Horse racing in the Philippines had its origins during the Spanish colonial era. For a decade in the late 1860s to 1870s, members of prominent families held “fun runs”, racing Philippine ponies on a quarter-mile (400 meters) straight course from San Sebastian Church to Quiapo Church. Organized purely for recreation, there was no official betting on these races. The races were held only once a year, in April or May, with tokens such as gold and silver medals, watches, or other ornaments as the prizes.

Racing in the Philippines had its formal start with the establishment of the Manila Jockey Club in 1867 by 100 socio fundadores, members of prominent and affluent Spanish, Filipino, and English families of the time. The club's first racetrack was in Sta. Mesa. A more permanent structure. the San Lazaro Hippodrome, was built in Tayuman, Manila, where it stayed for decades until the track was transferred in 2003 to Carmona, Cavite, where it is now called the San Lazaro Leisure Park.

In 1937, the Philippine Racing Club was founded by a group of Filipino and American investors. Their racetrack was Santa Ana Park, located at the boundary of Makati City and Manila. The track was moved to Naic, Cavite in January 2009, where it is now located within Saddle and Clubs Leisure Park.

In 2013, horseowner Dr Norberto Quisumbing Jr. established Metro Manila Turf Club, Inc. in Malvar, Batangas.

Establishment of Philracom  
Republic Act No. 309, An Act to Regulate Horse Racing in the Philippines, was promulgated in 1948. It established the Commission on Races which was mandated to supervise and regulate the sport.

In 1950, Executive Order No. 392 signed by then-president Elpidio Quirino created the Games and Amusements Board (GAB). The duties and functions of the Commission on Racing as well as the Boxing and Wrestling Commission and "the Jai-Alai" [sic] were transferred to the newly-created GAB.

Philracom was founded in 1974 to handle the growing Philippine Thoroughbred industry, which not only included racing among its activities but also breeding. Horses and feeds were increasingly being imported from abroad, and the Philracom regulated related processes and procedures.

The duties and functions related to horse racing that had been with GAB were transferred to Philracom, except for supervision and regulation of betting which was a function retained by GAB  as provided for in Sections 6, 11, 15, 18 and 24 of Republic Act No. 309, and by PD 420.

The agency also implemented greater supervision over the conduct of the sport and wagering system, instituting live broadcast coverage of the races, photo patrol cameras, and other innovations of the time that protected the interest of the betting public.

Leadership 
The Commission is presently composed of one chairman and six commissioners. All are appointive positions. Each commissioner represents a sector of the horse racing industry - horseowners, jockeys, trainers, and the racing public. The commissioners meet regularly to deliberate upon matters of policy, direct strategy, and formulate and amend Philippine horse racing rules and regulations.

2020–present: Aurelio "Reli" P. de Leon (chairman); Dante M. Lantin, Jose S. Embang, Jr., Victor V. Tantoco, and Lyndon Noel B. Guce (commissioners).

2019–2020: Andrew A. Sanchez (chairman); Lyndon Noel B. Guce, Dante M. Lantin, Bienvenido C. Niles Jr., Victor V. Tantoco, and Wilfredo Jefferson A. de Ungria (commissioners).

February 7, 2015–February 28, 2019: Andrew A. Sanchez (chairman); Ramon S. Bagatsing Jr., Lyndon Noel B. Guce, Bienvenido C. Niles Jr., Jose P.G. Santillan Jr., Victor V. Tantoco, and Wilfredo Jefferson A. de Ungria (commissioners).

2011–February 6, 2015: Angel L. Castano Jr. (chairman); Reynaldo G. Fernando, Victor V. Tantoco, Lyndon Noel B. Guce, Franco L. Loyola, Eduardo B. Jose, and Jesus B. Cantos.

2008–2011: Jose Ferdinand M. Rojas II (chairman); Gerardo J. Espina, Eduardo C. Domingo Jr., Vergel A. Cruz, Reynaldo G. Fernando, Victor V. Tantoco, and James Erving L. Paman.

2006–2008: Florencio D. Fianza Jr. (chairman); Jose Ferdinand M. Rojas II, Eduardo C. Doming Jr., Vergel A. Cruz, Reynaldo G. Fernando, Victor V. Tantoco.

2002–2006: Jaime A. Dilag (chairman); Rogelio A. Tandiama, Eduardo C. Domingo Jr., Vergel A. Cruz, Reynaldo G. Fernando, Francis B. Trillana Jr., Marlon C. Cunanan, Felizardo R. Sevilla Jr., Eduardo B. Jose.

2001–2002: Andrew A. Sanchez (chairman); Jaime A. Dilag, Francis B. Trillana Jr., Lyndon Noel B. Guce, Vergel A. Cruz, Rogelio A. Tandiama, Antonio C. Alcasid Sr., Felizardo R. Sevilla Jr.

1998–2001: Benedicto K. Katigbak (chairman); Eduardo C. Domingo Jr., Ramon R. Balatbat, Eduardo T. Galang, Victor V. Tantoco, Dante R. Arevalo, Enrique P. Romualdez.

1994–1998: Antonio M. Lagdameo (chairman); Eduardo C. Domingo Jr., Alberto M. de Castro, Lorenzo M. Alberto, Fortunato P. Jaime, Mario M. Oreta, Francisco Paulino V. Cayco.

1993–1994: Jose C. Avelino Jr. (chairman); Eduardo C. Domingo Jr., Alberto M. de Castro, Francisco Paulino V. Cayco, Antonio M. Lagdameo, Melvin A. Vargas, Danilo A. Marasigan.

1989–1993: Nicanor P. Jacinto III (chairman); Jose B. Loberiza, Jaime A. Dilag, Fernando C. Carrascoso, Danilo A. Marasigan, Eduardo C. Domingo Jr.

1986–1989: Augusto Benedicto L. Santos (chairman); Amado S. Bagatsing, Jose Y. Quiros, Rogerio P. Gonzales III, Nicanor P. Jacinto III, Federico B. Moreno, Samuel S. Sharuff.

1978–1986: Nemesio I. Yabut (chairman); Alfonso S. Lacson, Asterio G. Favis, Enrique P. Romualdez, Federico B. Moreno.

1975–1978: Eduardo M. Cojuangco Jr. (chairman); Asterio Favis, Alfonso S. Lacson.

Organizational structure

As a government agency under the Office of the President, Philracom is subject to the rules and regulations of the Civil Service Commission.

Board of Commissioners: formulates office policies as well as rules and regulations governing horse racing.

Office of the Executive Director: implements office policies as well as rules and regulations on horse racing; exercises overall authority in planning, directing, and coordinating the administrative and technical activities of the Commission.

Office of the Deputy Executive Director: assists in the planning, administrative coordination, and financial operational activities of the office in accordance with the set guidelines, policies, and directives from the Office of the President and government audit.

Finance and Administrative Division: encompasses all administrative services inherent in all government bureaus and offices; directs, supervises, and coordinates all the accounting activities of the Commission.

Regulation and Licensing Division: directs, supervises, and coordinates matters of licensing and registration involving horse racing; collaborates on formulation of policies, rules and regulations, and amendments thereto, as well as planning, directing, coordinating, and implementing technical activities of the Commission.

Field Inspection Division: implements the rules and regulations of horse racing; reports on violations, irregularities, and infractions of the racing rules committed during race meetings.

Stud Book Registry Division: regulates horse breeding; inspects race horses; conducts blood-typing and parentage verification; issues registration certificates for qualified foals, broodmares, and stallions; publishes the Philippine Stud Book.

Legal Division: supervises and coordinates the legal functions of the Commission involving review, preparation, and interpretation of legal documents as well as investigation and hearing of cases arising from violation of rules and regulations on horse racing.

Equine Laboratory and Disease Center: located in Carmona, Cavite, the ELCD conducts regular screening for Equine Infectious Anemia (EIA) using Coggins' test; and cooperates with racing clubs, race horse owners, trainers, and other stakeholders to monitor and maintain the EIA-free status of all horses at the racetracks, stables, and surrounding facilities.

Programs
Philracom Trainers Academy  
In 2015 the Commission, in order to professionalize the horse training sector, established the Philracom Trainers' Academy. It offers a two-year course for horse trainers. The Academy's administrators are veterinarians Dr. Ceferino Maala, member of the National Academy of Science and Technology, and Dr. Romy Modomo, equine medicine practitioner.

In 2017, the Academy graduated its first cohort of trainers, which took the batch name 'First Impact'. Among their members are trainers Dr. Grace Sandoval and Dewey Santos. A second round of training will be opened in April 2019.

The Academy is structured upon the 'educational cohort model', defined as "purposefully grouped students entering and pursuing a program of study together, characterized by social and cultural processes, shared experiences and interactions, collective efforts, and mutual commitment to an educational goal" (Horn, 2001; Maher, 2001, 2005; McPhail, 2000; Norris & Barnett, 1994; Yerkes, Basom, Barnett, & Norris, 1995). Specifically, the Academy follows the 'closed-cohort format', where students are "admitted as an identified group, and provided with a specific rotation of courses over a defined period of time" (Barnett & Muse, 1993; Maher, 2001, 2005).

Corporate Social Responsibility Program 
Philracom also sponsors charity races for qualified beneficiaries, wherein the prize of the day is donated to the chosen recipient.
The agency also holds regular medical and dental missions for the racing community, blood-letting sessions in cooperation with the Red Cross (national), tree-plantings, clothes donations drives, and other initiatives.

Sponsored Stakes Races
The Commission regularly sponsors stakes races that provide prize money higher than the usual prize of the day.
Among its important annual events are the Commissioner's Cup, the Philippine Triple Crown series (held in summer), Lakambini Stakes (for 3YO fillies), the Ambassador Eduardo M. Cojuangco Jr. Cup (also known as the ECJ Cup), Grand Sprint Championship, and the Chairman's Cup. Stakes races are also staged for local and imported horses, for juveniles, 3YO, and older horses, and for colts and fillies.

Philracom Awards
In 2016, the agency inaugurated the annual Philracom Awards, a recognition program that honors the top industry performers of the year.

1st Philracom Awards: February 14, 2016, San Lazaro Leisure Park 
Horse Owner of the Year: Narciso O. Morales; Horse Trainer of the Year: Ruben S. Tupas; Jockey of the Year: Ruben S. Tupas; Most Successful Racing Day: 7th Mayor Ramon D. Bagatsing Sr. Racing Festival; Breeder of the Year: SC Stockfarm, Inc.

''2nd Philracom Awards: March 24, 2017, Santa Ana Park 
Horse of the Year: Low Profile; Horse Owner of the Year: Narciso O. Morales; Horse Breeder of the Year: SC Stockfarm, Inc.; Jockey of the Year: Jonathan B. Hernandez; Trainer of the Year: Ruben S. Tupas; Most Successful Racing Festival of the Year: 8th Mayor Ramon D. Bagatsing Sr. Racing Festival; Racing Club of the Year: Philippine Racing Club, Inc.3rd Philracom Awards: January 28, 2018, San Lazaro Leisure Park 
Stakes Racehorse and Top Earning Racehorse of the Year: Sepfourteen; Stakes Races Horse Owner of the Year: SC Stockfarm, Inc.; Top Earning Horse Owner of the Year: Narciso O. Morales; Stakes Races Horse Trainer of the Year: Tomasito E. Santos; Top Earning Horse Trainer of the Year: Ruben S. Tupas; Stakes Races Jockey of the Year: John Alvin Guce; Top Earning Jockey of the Year: O'Neal P. Cortez; Horse Breeder of the Year: SC Stockfarm, Inc.; Most Successful Racing Festival of the Year: 9th Mayor Ramon D. Bagatsing Sr. Racing Festival; Racing Club of the Year (total horse prizes): Manila Jockey Club, Inc.; Racing Club of the Year (total gross sales): Metro Manila Turf Club, Inc.4th Philracom Awards'': January 20, 2019, San Lazaro Leisure Park 
Stakes Racehorses of the Year: tie between Pride of Laguna and Smart Candy; Top Earning Horse of the Year: Sepfourteen; Stakes Races Horse Owner of the Year: SC Stockfarm, Inc.; Top Earning Horse Owner of the Year: Narciso O. Morales; Stakes Races Horse Trainer of the Year: Ruben S. Tupas; Top Earning Horse Trainer of the Year: Ruben S. Tupas; Stakes Races Jockey of the Year: Jesse B. Guce; Top Earning Jockey of the Year: O'Neal P. Cortez; Horse Breeder of the Year: Leonardo M. Javier Jr.; Most Successful Racing Festival of the Year: Manila Horsepower, Inc.; Racing Club of the Year (total horse prizes): Manila Jockey Club, Inc.; Racing Club of the Year (total gross sales): Philippine Racing Club, Inc.

See also
Horseracing in the Philippines

References

1974 establishments in the Philippines
Government agencies established in 1974
Horse racing in the Philippines
Horse racing organizations
Establishments by Philippine presidential decree